Güven Gürsoy (born 7 February 1992) is a Turkish professional footballer who plays as a defender for Belediye Vanspor.

References

1992 births
Living people
Turkish footballers
Malatyaspor footballers
Beşiktaş J.K. footballers
Turkey youth international footballers
Association football defenders